Jean-Michel Guilcher (24 September 1914 – 27 March 2017) was a French ethnologist. He was a researcher at the CNRS, and he taught ethnology at the University of Western Brittany. He was the author of eight books about traditional dances.

Early life
Jean-Michel Guilcher was born on 24 September 1914 in Saint-Pierre-Quilbignon, Finistère. One of his grandmothers, who was from Aber-Ildut, sang the gwerz.

Guilcher was educated at the Lycée de Brest. He graduated from the University of Paris, where he studied natural history. He also took dance lessons from Alick-Maud Pledge. Later, he was mentored by the ethnologist Patrice Coirault, and he attended classes taught by Jacques Chailley with Constantin Brăiloiu. He subsequently earned a PhD in Dance Studies.

Career
Guilcher worked for Jeune France, a traditional dance organization in Lyon, from 1939 to 1942. During that time, he researched the traditional dances of villages near Lyon. He subsequently worked for Paul Faucher, where he edited Père Castor, a collection of children's books. After the war, he began researching the traditional dances of villages in Brittany.

Guilcher began working for the Centre national de la recherche scientifique (CNRS) in 1955. He later worked for the Musée national des Arts et Traditions Populaires, where he founded a section about dance. He was a professor of ethnology at the University of Western Brittany from 1969 to 1979. He subsequently served as the director of a research centre at the University of Western Brittany and the School for Advanced Studies in the Social Sciences.

Guilcher was the author of eight books about the traditional dances of Brittany.

Personal life and death
With his wife Hélène, Guilcher had three children. They resided in Meudon near Paris, where he died on 27 March 2017.

Works

References

1914 births
2017 deaths
People from Finistère
People from Meudon
University of Paris alumni
French ethnologists
French non-fiction writers
French centenarians
Men centenarians
Scientists from Brittany